Kanli Kula Fortress is an open-air amphitheater in Herceg Novi, Montenegro. The name is of Turkish origin, and means "bloody tower".

History 
Kanli Kula was built by the Turks in 1539. The Venetians made various repairs and additions in 1687, soon after conquering Herceg Novi.

Inside the castle there was a well preserved water cistern. At some stage it lost its original purpose and became a prison, and was thereafter called “Bloody Tower“. The inside of the Kanli Tower was restored into an open-air amphitheater in 1966. It seats over 1000 spectators, and has hosted many cultural events and festivals. 

Events that are organised in Kanli Kula have included the Herceg Novi Film Festival, Guitar Art Summer Fest and the Operosa Montenegro Opera Festival.

References

Forts in Montenegro
Amphitheaters
Performing arts venues in Montenegro
Herceg Novi
Buildings and structures completed in 1539